The Froebel gifts are educational play materials for young children, originally designed by Friedrich Fröbel for the first kindergarten at Bad Blankenburg. Playing with Froebel gifts, singing, dancing, and growing plants were each important aspects of this child-centered approach to education. The series was later extended from the original six to at least ten sets of gifts.

Description

The Sunday Papers published by Fröbel between 1838–1840 explained the meaning and described the use of each of his six initial "play gifts": "The active and creative, living and life producing being of each person, reveals itself in the creative instinct of the child. All human education is bound up in the quiet and conscientious nurture of this instinct of activity; and in the ability of the child, true to this instinct, to be active."

Between May 1837 and 1850, the Froebel gifts were made in Bad Blankenburg in the principality of Schwarzburg Rudolstadt, by master carpenter Löhn, assisted by artisans and women of the village. In 1850, production was moved to the Erzgebirge region of the Kingdom of Saxony in a factory established for this purpose by S F Fischer.

Fröbel also developed a series of activities ("occupations") such as sewing, weaving, and modeling with clay, for children to extend their experiences through play. Ottilie de Liagre in a letter to Fröbel in 1844 observed that playing with the Froebel gifts empowers children to be lively and free, but people can degrade it into a mechanical routine.

Each of the first five gifts was assigned a number by Fröbel in the Sunday Papers, which indicated the sequence in which each gift was to be given to child.

Gift 1 (infant) 
The first gift is a soft ball or yarn ball in solid color, which is the right size for the hand of a small child. When attached to a matching string, the ball can be moved by a mother in various ways as she sings to the child. Although Fröbel sold single balls, they are now usually supplied in sets of six balls consisting of the primary colors: red, yellow, and blue; as well as the secondary colors: purple, green, and orange. These soft balls can be squashed in the hand, and they revert to their original shapes.

The first gift was intended by Fröbel to be given to very young children. His intention was that, through holding, dropping, rolling, swinging, hiding, and revealing the balls, the child may acquire knowledge of objects and spatial relationships, movement, speed and time, color and contrast, and weights and gravity.

Gift 2 (1–2 years) 
The second gift originally consisted of two wooden objects, a sphere and a cube. Fröbel called this gift "the child's delight", since he observed the joy of each child discovering the differences between the sphere and cube.

The child is already familiar with the shape of the wooden sphere, which is the same as the ball of the first gift. The wooden sphere always looks the same when viewed from any direction. Like the child, the wooden sphere is always on the move. When rolled on a hard surface, the wooden sphere produces sounds. In contrast, the wooden cube is the surprise of the second gift. It remains where it is placed and from each direction presents a different appearance.

The second gift was developed to enable a child to explore and enjoy the differences between shapes. By attaching a string or inserting a rod in a hole drilled through these wooden geometric shapes, they can be spun by a child. Although the sphere always appears the same, the spinning cube reveals many shapes when spun in different ways. This led Fröbel to later include a wooden cylinder in the second gift, which may also be spun in many different ways.

Gift 3 (2–3 years) 
The familiar shape of the cube is now divided into eight identical beechwood cubes, about one inch along each edge, which is a convenient size for the hand of a small child. A child delights in pulling apart this gift, rearranging the eight cubes in many ways, and then reassembling them in the form of a cube. This is the first building gift.

Gift 4 (2–3 years) 
This second building gift at first appears the same as in Gift 3. But a surprise awaits the child when the pieces are pulled apart. Each of these eight identical beechwood blocks is a rectangular plank, twice as long and half the width of the cubes of the previous gift. Many new possibilities for play and construction arise due to these differences.

Gift 5 (3–4 years) 
This building gift consists of more cubes, some of which are divided in halves or quarters.

Gift 6 (4–5 years) 
A set of more complex wooden blocks that includes cubes, planks, and triangular prisms.

Influence 
Froebel gifts were adapted by Caroline Pratt for the school which she founded in 1913 in the Greenwich Village district of New York City. This school embodied a child-centered approach to education. Children worked together to reconstruct their experiences through play. Based on the ideas of Friedrich Fröbel, the curriculum was drawn from the environment of the child; observations about the neighborhood inspired each child to reflect on their world directly so that they could make sense of their experiences.

Joachim Liebschner commented in his book, A Child's Work: Freedom and Guidance in Froebel's Educational Theory and Practice "Realising how the Gifts were eventually misused by Kindergarten teachers who followed after Fröbel, it is important to consider what Fröbel expected the gifts to achieve. He envisaged that the Gifts will teach the child to use his (or her) environment as an educational aid; secondly, that they will give the child an indication of the connection between human life and life in nature; and finally that they will create a bond between the adult and the child who play with them"

Fröbel's building forms and movement games were forerunners of abstract art as well as a source of inspiration to the Bauhaus movement.  Many modernist architects were exposed as children to Fröbel's ideas about geometry, including Frank Lloyd Wright, Le Corbusier, and Buckminster Fuller. Wright was given a set of the Froebel blocks at about age nine, and in his autobiography he cited them indirectly in explaining that he learned the geometry of architecture in kindergarten play:  Wright later wrote, "The virtue of all this lay in the awakening of the child-mind to rhythmic structures in Nature… I soon became susceptible to constructive pattern evolving in everything I saw."

Current availability
Froebel gifts continue to be used in early childhood education in Korea and Japan, where they are made from local timber.

Reproduction sets can be ordered via the Internet.

See also 
Alphabet blocks (ABC blocks)
Montessori sensorial materials
Unit block
Waldorf doll

References

External links
 Play is the work of children 
 Friedrich Froebel website
 Froebel Web
 Froebel USA
 Online links to Froebel educational resources
 Link to paper by Quinn which includes detailed descriptions and color photographs

Early childhood education materials
Construction toys
Educational toys
Wooden toys
Mathematical manipulatives